Meredith Township may refer to the following townships in the United States:

 Meredith Township, Wake County, North Carolina
 Meredith Township, Cloud County, Kansas